Kinza Hashmi (born 7 March 1997) is a Pakistani actress who works in Urdu television. She made her debut in 2014 with Adhura Milan as Nayab and later on appeared in several serials. Hashmi is best known for playing Rushna in Hum TV's romantic Ishq Tamasha (2018) for which she was nominated for Best Actress in Negative Role at Hum Awards

Television

Telefilm

Music video appearances

Awards and nominations

References

External links

21st-century Pakistani actresses
Pakistani female models
Pakistani Muslims
Year of birth missing (living people)
Living people
Place of birth missing (living people)
Punjabi people
1997 births